Trochomodulus carchedonius is a species of small sea snail, a marine gastropod mollusk in the family Modulidae.

Distribution

Description 

Habitat 

References

 Landau B., Vermeij G. K. & Reich S. (2014). Classification of the Modulidae (Caenogastropoda, Cerithioidea), with new genera and new fossil species from the Neogene of tropical America and Indonesia. Basteria. 78(1-3): 1-29.

External links

Modulidae
Gastropods described in 1822